Bad Oldesloe-Land is an Amt ("collective municipality") in the district of Stormarn, in Schleswig-Holstein, Germany. It is situated around Bad Oldesloe, which is the seat of the Amt, but not part of it.

The Amt Bad Oldesloe-Land consists of the following municipalities:

Grabau 
Lasbek 
Meddewade 
Neritz 
Pölitz 
Rethwisch 
Rümpel
Steinburg 
Travenbrück 

Ämter in Schleswig-Holstein